Martin's cruise of 1794 was the only significant French naval operation of the year in the Mediterranean Sea. In 1793 France had gone to war with Great Britain and a wide coalition of European enemies in the French Revolutionary Wars. Early in the conflict the British had seized the French Mediterranean Fleet and their home port of Toulon, the town enduring a four month siege by French Republican forces in which the fleet was badly damaged. With the town and fleet back in French hands, the French set about effecting repairs as the British attacked the island of Corsica.

In June 1794 the French commander Contre-amiral Pierre Martin led a squadron of ships out to contest British operations off Corsica. There was initial success when the frigate Boudeuse attacked and captured the Sardinian frigate Alceste off Fréjus on 8 June, but three days later Martin was forced to retreat from the main strength of the British fleet under Lord Hood. The French anchored in Gourjean Bay, and although Hood planned a number of attacks on the French position, ultimately it was decided that Martin was too well protected and a blockade was put in place instead.

Martin was able to escape the blockade in November and return to Toulon without further incident. The captured Alceste, formerly a French ship captured in 1793, was taken to Nice and returned to service with the French Navy. The frigate went on to play a crucial role at the action of 8 March 1795 and came under heavy fire at the Battle of the Hyères Islands trying to save a damaged French ship of the line. Alceste was eventually captured once more by the British in 1799.

Background
A few months after the entry of Great Britain into the French Revolutionary Wars in February 1793, a large Royal Navy fleet was sent to operate in the Mediterranean. Their principal mission was a blockade of Toulon, the main base for the French Mediterranean Fleet. The British fleet, under Lord Hood, arrived off Toulon in August 1793 to find that the port was in upheaval, conflict between Girondists and Jacobins raging against the backdrop of the Reign of Terror. Hood interceded in the dispute, persuading the Girondist faction to declare for the exiled French monarchy and invite the British to take control of the city and fleet.

Hood's forced entered Toulon, and the town was soon counter-attacked by French Republican forces. The ensuing Siege of Toulon lasted four months, the city falling to Republican attack on 18 December. At its conclusion, Hood sent boat parties into Toulon harbour to burn the French fleet, but ultimately only half of the fleet was destroyed, the remainder left damaged but repairable. Those French ships in condition to sail were removed from the harbour and distributed among the allies who had participated in the siege; the British took six frigates and gave one, Alceste, to the Kingdom of Sardinia.

In the spring of 1794, as the French repaired their damaged fleet, Hood turned his attention to the French-held island of Corsica, then in open rebellion. In the ensuing invasion of Corsica, Hood's forces allied with the Corsican irregulars to attack first San Fiorenzo and then Bastia, besieging the French garrisons of the Corsican towns and forcing them to surrender.

Martin's cruise
In Toulon, command of the French fleet had been granted to Contre-amiral Pierre Martin, who was assembling a 15-ship convoy to supply Corsica and raise the siege of Bastia. A squadron of his less damaged ships, comprising seven ships of the line and several frigates, was to escort the convoy. After Bastia fell to the British on 19 May, the original plans for the French relief convoy were abandoned, but Martin decided to offer a challenge to the British hegemony in the Ligurian Sea, and sailed with his squadron for a cruise in the region on 6 June.

There is no mention of this encounter in British histories. News of Martin's activity soon reached Hood, then at anchor with 13 ships of the line off Bastia, and he ordered Alceste, operating as part of his fleet under a Captain Ross, to sail from Bastia to the French coast to warn the British ships operating off Toulon.

Catching Alceste

On 8 June 1794, as the French squadron passed eastwards along the coast, lookouts spotted an unidentified sail between the squadron and the shore; this ship was Alceste. Martin's squadron then approached the ship flying false British ensigns which fooled Ross. Alceste approached the squadron with confidence and his crew only realised their mistake when it was too late to escape.

Boudeuse and Alceste fought for two hours, the smaller French ship taking serious damage to its rigging and mainmast from the gunfire of Alceste. Ross was unable however to escape his opponent, and this allowed the 80-gun ship of the line Tonnant to pull within range. Recognising that further resistance was hopeless, Ross allowed Tonnant to fire three shots before he struck his colours. Boudeuse was so damaged that Martin sent the ship back to Toulon for repairs, although Alceste was mostly intact and was sent to Nice under a prize crew with the captured 14-gun merchant brig Expedition, taken the same day by the frigate Sérieuse while sailing from Bastia to Livorno.

Retreat to Gourjean Bay
Within hours of the victory over Alceste, Martin was being hunted by Hood and the main British Mediterranean Fleet. On 10 June Hood discovered the French squadron and gave chase. At 14:00 on 11 June Martin reached the sheltered anchorage at Gourjean Bay, his rearmost ships exchanging fire with HMS Dido under Captain George Henry Towry as they entered the bay, which was protected by forts overlooking the anchorage. As it entered the bay, the French squadron was becalmed, and had to be taken in tow by their launches before they could anchor in suitable positions.

Hood intended to lead his fleet into the bay and bring Martin to battle, issuing detailed plans of attack to his captains, but the calm forestalled this effort and gave Martin time to remove cannon from his ships and erect batteries on the shore, significantly strengthening his position. Hood ordered fireships to be readied but these weapons were driven back on approaching the bay by the French forts and batteries. Hood then withdrew with part of his fleet to the ongoing Siege of Calvi, leaving a force under Vice-Admiral William Hotham to blockade the French. Hotham trapped Martin's division in the bay for five months, and it was not until 2 November that it returned to Toulon, after a storm drove off Hotham's squadron.

Aftermath
With Martin unable to influence operations on Corsica, Calvi fell to the British in August and Corsica became a self-governing part of the British Empire. Martin continued with repairs to the fleet, so that by March 1795 he was able to deploy 17 ships on a renewed operation in the Ligurian Sea. With this fleet was Alceste, which fought at the action of 8 March 1795 when the British ship of the line , badly damaged in a storm, was chased down and captured by a division of Martin's fleet. Alceste led the attack and although badly damaged, the frigate was able to kill the British captain and delay Berwick until heavier support could arrive.

Later in the year Alceste was with the fleet which fought at the Battle of the Hyères Islands, the frigate attempting unsuccessfully to bring support to the crippled French ship  while under heavy fire. Alceste continued to serve with the French Mediterranean Fleet until 1799, when the ship was part of a French squadron overrun and captured by a British fleet under Lord Keith during the Croisière de Bruix campaign.

Orders of battle

References

Bibliography 
 
 
 
 
 
 

Campaigns of the French Revolutionary Wars
Conflicts in 1794
French Revolutionary Wars orders of battle